Launt Pond is a small reservoir located north of Shinhopple in Delaware County, New York. East Trout Brook flows through Launt Pond.

See also
 List of lakes in New York

References 

Lakes of New York (state)
Lakes of Delaware County, New York
Reservoirs in Delaware County, New York